When Strangers Marry is a 1933 American pre-Code  drama film directed by Clarence G. Badger and starring Jack Holt, Lilian Bond and Gustav von Seyffertitz.

Cast
Jack Holt as Steve Rand
Lilian Bond as Marian Drake
Arthur Vinton as Hinkle
Barbara Barondess as Antonia
Ward Bond as Billy McGuire
Gustav von Seyffertitz as Van Wyck
Paul Porcasi as Phillipe
Rudolph Anders as Von Arnheim
Charles Stevens as Chattermahl
Harry Stubbs as 	Major Oliver

References

External links

1933 drama films
1930s English-language films
American drama films
Columbia Pictures films
American black-and-white films
Films directed by Clarence G. Badger
1930s American films